Trokoniz is a hamlet and council located in the municipality of Iruraiz-Gauna, in Álava province, Basque Country, Spain. As of 2020, it has a population of 82.

Geography 
Trokoniz is located 13km east-southeast of Vitoria-Gasteiz.

References

Populated places in Álava